Ashton-on-Ribble is a suburb of Preston, Lancashire, England. The population at the 2011 census was 4,459.

Ashton-on-Ribble was recorded in the Domesday Book.

Demographics
The 2011 census records the ward's population at 4,459; in 2001 the recorded population was 4,430. At the 2007 Preston Council election the ward had a valid electorate of 3,104.

From the census results, 67.8% of the population considered themselves Christian.

Geography
A ward in the western part of Preston, Ashton is largely suburban with large houses bordering the renewed Docklands area. Part of the ward is also made up of terraced housing, predominantly between Lane Ends shopping area and Ashton Park. The railway line from Preston railway station to Blackpool North railway station runs through the ward.

People
Actor Kenny Baker was a resident of Ashton-on-Ribble.

Footballer Chris Ward was born in Ashton-on-Ribble.

Actress Maggie Ollerenshaw was born in Ashton-on-Ribble.

Historian AJP Taylor lived in Ashton-on Ribble 1919-1929.

See also
Districts of Preston
St Andrew's Church, Ashton-on-Ribble
St Michael and All Angel's Church, Ashton-on-Ribble

References

External links 

 Ashton-on-Ribble's community website
 

Geography of Preston
Wards of Preston